The electoral division of Lyons is one of the five electorates in the Tasmanian House of Assembly, it is the largest electorate covering most of central and eastern Tasmania. Lyons is named jointly in honor of Joseph Lyons, Prime Minister of Australia (1932–1939); Premier of Tasmania (1923–1928), and Joseph's wife, Dame Enid Lyons, the first woman elected to the Australian House of Representatives in 1943. The electorate shares its name and boundaries with the federal division of Lyons.

Lyons and the other House of Assembly electoral divisions are each represented by five members elected under the Hare-Clark electoral system.

History and electoral profile
Before 1984, it was known as the Division of Wilmot. In 1984, it was renamed to jointly honour Joseph Lyons, and his wife, Dame Enid Lyons, the first woman elected to the Australian House of Representatives in 1943 and subsequently the first female member of Cabinet (1949–1951). Joseph Lyons represented the area for over 30 years at the state (1909-1929) and federal (1929-1939) levels.

Lyons is the largest electorate in Tasmania measuring 33,212 km2, it includes the far northern suburbs of Hobart and the towns of St. Helens, Swansea, Bicheno, Campbell Town, Longford, Evandale and Bothwell.

Representation

Distribution of seats

Members for Lyons and Wilmot

See also

 Tasmanian Legislative Council

References

External links
Parliament of Tasmania
Tasmanian Electoral Commission - House of Assembly

Lyons
Central Highlands (Tasmania)
East Coast Tasmania
Lyons (state)